Mord ist mein Geschäft, Liebling (Killing is My Business, Honey) is a  German comedy directed by .

Plot 
Enrico Puzzo (Franco Nero) is an eccentric Italian author who claims he knows the Mafia from inside. Based on these allegations he wrote a book and sold it under a pen name to a German publishing house. Puzzo lives in an expensive hotel, where he doesn't hesitate to threaten employees with his pistol in case something isn't to his liking. He also consumes a great deal of cocaine, sometimes even at broad daylight on the balcony of his hotel suite. As crazy as he is, he writes on a typewriter and sends a unique typescript to his publisher who is already about to have a huge press conference on this book. That is when Toni Ricardelli (Rick Kavanian), a German-born hitman of suave behaviour, comes into play. He intercepts the script just in time, leaving the publisher Christopher Kimbel (Hans-Michael Rehberg) empty-handed. Not the mafia, but the publisher is embarrassed.

Editor Julia Steffens (Nora Tschirner) loses her job because of this fiasco. But she is encouraged by her fiancé, Christoper Kimbel's son Bob (Janek Rieke) to try redeem herself. In order to do so she travels to Italy for she wants to persuade Enrico Puzzo to write it all again. Before she gets to him, Toni Ricardelli does. She nearly catches Toni in the act of killing Puzzo. Yet Toni is enchanted by her innocent charm and her cute clumsiness. Julia thinks he was Puzzo and he eventually indulges her because he is in love and just wants to be with her by all means.

She takes Ricardelli to Germany, where he asks his blind uncle Pepe (Bud Spencer) to make up some stories and to have them written down by a restaurant owner. But now mafia boss Salvatore Marino (Günther Kaufmann) also believes Ricardelli was the unknown author and wants to have him killed. Trying to achieve that he hires a bunch of killers including Ricardelli's old rival Helmut Münchinger (Christian Tramitz). Fortunately Münchinger is always distracted by phone calls of his beloved wife on his mobile phone. In the end Bob Kimbel marries his secretary Lisa (Jasmin Schwiers) and Toni Ricardelli lives to marry Julia Steffens.

Cast
 Rick Kavanian: Toni Ricardelli
 Nora Tschirner: Julia Steffens
 Janek Rieke: Bob Kimbel
 Hans-Michael Rehberg: Christopher Kimbel 
 Christian Tramitz: Helmut Münchinger
 Ludger Pistor: Dr. Gruber
 Günther Kaufmann: Salvatore Marino
 Bud Spencer: Pepe
 Jasmin Schwiers: Lisa
 Franco Nero: Enrico Puzzo
 Wolfgang Völz: Henry von Göttler
 Axel Stein: Dirk
 Chi Le: Maria
 Nela Panghy-Lee: Mercedes
 Wolf Roth: Paolo Rossi
 Oscar Ortega Sánchez: Garcia 'El Toro'
 Doris Kunstmann: Frau Eisenstein

See also 
 Code Name: The Cleaner

External links
 
  
  Official website (German)
 
  featuring Marc Secara
 Homepage of director Sebastian Niemann (English)

2009 films
German comedy films
2000s German-language films
2000s parody films
2000s screwball comedy films
2009 comedy films
2000s German films